Worldwar is a series of novels by Harry Turtledove whose premise is an alien invasion of Earth in the middle of World War II. The following is a list of some of the major characters from his series.

Major Humans

Mordechai Anielewicz (historical): Anielewicz, together with other Polish Jews, is liberated from Nazi occupation by the Race, who subsequently capture and shut down Auschwitz. In the wake of salvation, Anielewicz and his fellow Jews are faced with the agonising dilemma between siding with the Race against Nazi Germany, which has postponed but not altogether forsaken the implementation of the Final Solution – and in effect becoming "traitors to humanity"; or fighting against the Race, an act which would make them Nazi allies. He is responsible for handing a portion of plutonium to scientists working in the United States to create an atomic bomb.

Flight Lieutenant George Bagnall: A flight engineer in the Royal Air Force serving aboard a Lancaster bomber. Bagnall is part of an 11,000-bomber flight number returning from a run over Cologne in Germany when the invasion begins. The armada of bombers is under attack from German anti-aircraft weapons and fighters when the Race's killer craft descend upon the unsuspecting humans. The resulting battle leaves dozens of German and British planes destroyed with no significant damage inflicted upon the Race. He flies a Lancaster bomber with a radar to the Russian town of Pskov, and when the Lizards destroy the bomber on the ground, he and the aircrew become unwilling members of the ground forces defending the town. They go on to serve as arbitrators between the Russian partisan forces and German Wehrmacht troops in the town; eventually,  Bagnall and the others except of navigator Alf Whyte (who is killed in action) can return to England. Bagnall's Lancaster is the site of one of Turtledove's rare inaccuracies: the author describes it as having a ball turret, which no Lancaster ever carried but was used on the American B-17 Flying Fortress.

David Goldfarb: A radar operator in the Royal Air Force. When the Race carries out air reconnaissance in the months before their attack, Goldfarb and his fellow radar specialists are confused by readings indicating aircraft much faster and high-flying than anything known to humans: the RAF men nickname those echoes "pixies". No one believes aircraft can fly as fast or as high as the readings indicate. He eventually takes part in the British attempt to mount radar in newly developed jet fighters. When England is invaded by the Race's ground forces he is absorbed into an infantry unit and fights for several weeks against the Race on the ground in England. He takes part in decoding the Lizards' solid-state electronics (integrated circuits and microprocessors, which should be familiar to any 21st-century reader).

Lieutenant Ludmila Gorbunova: One of many female pilots in the Soviet Union's Red Air Force. Stationed at an airfield near Kharkiv in Ukraine when the invasion begins, Ludmila witnesses the destruction of most human aircraft, both Soviet and German, at the hands of the alien invaders. She flies a Polikarpov Po-2, a small wooden biplane with a low ceiling. Its qualities render it practically invisible to radar, enabling her to survive the initial alien attack and allow her to make light ground attacks on unsuspecting Race encampments. She develops a relationship with Colonel Jäger after she finds him conversing with some farmers. While she is first suspicious of this German officer, both of them realize that there are human beings on either side of the propaganda-heavy front. Nevertheless, she treads very carefully when developing their relationship, as his letters to her are monitored and recorded by the NKVD. The character is inspired by members of the historical all-women Soviet unit known as Night Witches, many of whom were decorated for their World War II service. The two flee to the city of Lodz after meeting in northwestern Poland (Jäger is serving on Germany's border with Poland) and help foil Otto Skorzeny's plot to set off an atomic bomb in the city.

Colonel Leslie Groves (historical): He was head of America's atomic bomb development. His first task is to get a batch of captured alien plutonium from Boston, Massachusetts to Denver, Colorado where the Metallurgical Laboratory developing the atom bomb has been relocated. He is very well aware that the Soviet Union and Germany are also working fervently to develop the first human atomic weapons and he is eager to win the race.

Colonel Heinrich Jäger: A tank commander in the German Sixth Army advancing on Stalingrad when the alien invasion begins. Jäger fought in the trenches of World War I as a teenager and saw firsthand the devastating effects of armored vehicles on infantry. After the Armistice he stayed in the army, serving in the Reichswehr of the Weimar Republic. When Adolf Hitler began rearming Germany in the 1930's, Jäger requested reassignment to the Panzer Corps. If he was going to see combat in another war, he wanted to fight from a tank cupola. The character has some similarities with Colonel Sabrino, a dragon rider in Turtledove's The Darkness Series. His small knowledge of the Holocaust and German atrocities in Eastern Europe leaves him sickened; he is later arrested by the Gestapo for treating the Jews of Lodz and is rescued by members of his regiment. He is depicted as a good and somewhat charismatic officer; he and Ludmila Gorbunova can make a new life in Lodz. It is implied that Jäger is a distant relative of the American Sam Yeager.

Jens Larssen: A physicist at the University of Chicago. When the Race begins its attack on Earth, they detonate several atomic bombs just above the Earth's atmosphere hoping to disrupt human electronics with the resulting electromagnetic radiation. This attempt at subterfuge fails since electronics of the 1940s use vacuum tubes rather than integrated circuits, making the effect of EM radiation minimal. However, Larssen is among the handful of human scientists to realize that the attack proves nuclear fission is feasible. This is important since Larssen is working alongside several other scientists to develop an atomic bomb. He is sent on a cross-country trip to alert the US federal government of the importance of the atomic bomb project; while he is gone his wife, Barbara, believing him dead, begins an affair with Sam Yeager, marries him, and, when she is impregnated by him, she chooses to stay with Yeager. This is a major contributor to Larssen's eventual mental destabilization. He shoots two people and attempts to desert  Lizards, intending to betray the US atomic bomb project to them, but is stopped by a cavalry company and is killed.

Vyacheslav Molotov (historical): Head of the Soviet Union's Foreign Ministry, Molotov is given the unenviable task of negotiating with Fleetlord Atvar. Possessing an icy and taciturn demeanor, he proves adept at reading the intentions of his adversaries, both human and alien. The only time Molotov reveals any sign of emotion is around Joseph Stalin, who elicits a certain amount of fear in him. Along with Germany's Joachim von Ribbentrop, Molotov is among the first humans to orbit the Earth. He is instrumental in negotiating the Peace of Cairo with the Race.

Moishe Russie: A student in medicine in Poland when the Germans invaded in 1939. Since he is Jewish, Moishe and his family are forced by the German authorities to live in the Warsaw Ghetto. It is revealed later that plans were underway to ship most of the Jews in the ghetto to Auschwitz. When the alien invasion begins, Moishe advises his fellow Jews to greet the Race as liberators after one of their bombs inadvertently blows a hole in the ghetto wall, and they are treated as such even after the Race destroys Berlin with a nuclear device. (Despite objections by Anielewicz, Russie insists on praying for the souls of the civilians killed in the blast.) He becomes cruelly disillusioned as to the nature of their "liberators" when he is told by the new Race governor to make a radio propaganda broadcast praising the subsequent nuclear destruction of Washington, D.C. He is smuggled by Mordechai Anielewicz's Jewish underground to England, where he continues his radio propaganda broadcasts—although they are now anti-Race, rather than pro-Race. He takes part in the fighting during the Race's invasion of England as a medic, and is later transported to Palestine by the British to convince the Jews there to remain loyal to England. When the Race captures Palestine he continues his medical studies, becoming an adviser on human affairs to Atvar, the Race's fleetlord.

Otto Skorzeny (historical): SS Hauptsturmführer, Skorzeny is a Waffen-SS commando known for his unconventional thinking. He becomes a particularly feared human to the Race. He staged a major turnover for the Nazis in Croatia, and bargained for a Race Land cruiser with a backpack full of ginger, which turns out to have narcotic and possibly hallucinogenic effects on members of the Race. He is killed by Heinrich Jäger and Mordechai Anielewicz in Lodz while trying to set off an atom bomb there.

Sam Yeager: A minor league ball player with the Decatur Commodores when the invasion takes place. Like many young men, he tried to enlist in the Army in the wake of the Japanese attack on Pearl Harbor at the end of 1941. However, he was rejected because he must wear a full plate of dentures after losing his teeth during the 1918 flu pandemic. His train was strafed south of Dixon, Illinois during the opening hours of the invasion. Not long afterward, he enlists in a desperate US Army to defend Chicago from the invading Race. His passion for science fiction during his long stint as a minor league player makes him a choice pick as "Lizard liaison;" he becomes one of the most valued interpreters for the United States' interrogations of Race prisoners. He falls in love with Barbara Larssen, Jens Larssen's former wife, while she believes Larssen to be dead. He impregnates her on their wedding night, leading to her decision to remain married to him when the pair discover Larssen is alive after all. He becomes an authority on the Race, eventually becoming the most renowned human expert on the species. It is implied that Yeager is a distant relative of the German Heinrich Jäger.

Liu Han: A Chinese housewife whose innocuous village was raided by the Race and Japanese forces almost simultaneously. Her family was killed when her house (and that of the local magistrate's) was immolated in a Japanese bomb attack. She was abducted by the Race along with apothecary Yi Min, and after a bit of interesting conversation between an initially scared Yi Min and some officers of the Race, she is subjected to what are literally sexual experiments devised by the Race to study human mating habits. (The Race reproduce only when females go into season.) She is subsequently forced to have sex with several different men, eventually ending up going steady with Bobby Fiore, one of Yeager's teammates. Ironically, these experiments are not done for the reptilian humanoid Race's perverted enjoyment, rather it is a dramatic species reversal as humans often observe the mating habits of animals. She later becomes pregnant by Fiore, and finds her impressions of foreign human "devils" are dispelled (albeit replaced by that of the "scaly devils"). She becomes connected with the Communist guerrillas in China, and eventually joins the party, rising through the ranks to become a leader in the revolutionary movement.

Yi Min: A Chinese apothecary abducted with Liu Han when the Race raided his village. Thanks to some negotiation, he finds his stay aboard the Race's ship rather entertaining as he is subjected to "experiments" which effectively give him a harem of women to mate with. Later, he is found back on Earth in a Race prison camp, dealing in ginger. It is implied that he is the one who introduced the Race to this highly addictive spice, and he is more than eager to trade it for rather technologically advanced Race items, though he intends to sell these items off for even more prestige. As a result, his dwelling in the camp is more lavish than the ones the other Chinese prisoners are forced to stay in. He is killed by Drefsab, a Race security officer, in a vain attempt to stem the flow of ginger to Race soldiers.

The Race

Fleetlord Atvar: The commander of the Race's Conquest Fleet. He is related to the Emperor and owes his position partly due to that fact. (However, after the initial mention of this relationship early in the series, no further reference is ever again made to it.) In the course of the series it is revealed that aptitude tests back on Home indicated Atvar woulAvtareither a proficient architect or military officer. He chose a military career believing it would be more exciting. At the beginning of the conflict he is faced with the decision to invade Earth or return home to ask for directions (the latter apparently having a humiliating and degrading connotation.) However, got discouraged as he is faced with a significantly more technologically advanced species than initial reports suggested: The most recent intelligence on Earth (Tosev-3 as labeled by the Race) dated back to the Middle Ages.

Flight Leader Teerts: A killercraft pilot from the Conquest Fleet. His is among the jet fighters that rapidly neutralize human air power in the opening days of the invasion. By the end of the first few weeks, the Race achieves air superiority over the planet, forcing human pilots to engage in small limited attacks upon isolated targets or risk nearly certain death. However he is unfortunate enough to be shot down when Japanese bullets lodge themselves in the engines of his fighter plane, and is captured by the Japanese. While he is somewhat curious (and rather condescending) of Japanese imperial customs, he is even more afraid of their officers, who seem all too happy to want to extract as many Race secrets as they can from him, by cruel physical torture if need be. He is also unpleasantly surprised to find out firsthand that these "Nippon-ese" soldiers are also very proficient at martial arts. The Japanese addict him to ginger while he is captive; he later escapes and goes on to fly repeated missions against the Tosevites. He takes part in the atomic bombing of Munich, retaliation for the German bomb outside of Breslau, and is killed when the blast of the bomb the Americans set off outside Denver causes his aircraft to become uncontrollable and crash into a hillside.

Straha: Shiplord (that is, ship captain) who vocally opposes Atvar's strategies. He asks for a vote of confidence in Atvar's leadership, which fails to obtain the 75% super-majority necessary for Atvar's removal. In anticipation of Atvar's against him, Straha exiles himself (in shame) among the humans. He lands in the United States, where he is kept as a prisoner of war, and intensely questioned on Race technology. He becomes a propagandist for the US. Despite being well cared-for, he misses the companionship of fellow members of the Race.

Ussmak: A driver for the crew of a Landcruiser in the Conquest Fleet. He is one of the Lizard "Everyman" viewpoint characters. At first, Ussmak and his crew mates revel at the ease with which they manage to destroy T-34's and Panzer IVs, the most advanced armored fighting vehicles available to the Soviets and Germans, respectively. However, they soon grow disillusioned when the humans continue to resist the invasion despite their clear military inferiority, compounded by the weather conditions of the planet, which are more suited to human than Race machinery. Ussmak eventually finds himself wondering if this is a fight worth waging. He is a ginger taster, dealing with the herb's effects better than most of his fellow soldiers. He takes part in the failed campaign against Britain, where his commander is wounded. After recovering, the crew is transferred to Siberia, where they are killed by Soviet raiders. High on ginger, he shoots the commandant of the Race's forward base to which he had been assigned and leads the first mutiny the Race has ever known. He surrenders the base to the USSR, and after endless interrogations is sent to a Karelian gulag, where he dies of starvation, over-exhaustion, and malnourished.

Other historical characters

Some historical characters also appear for brief cameos, to give an historical feel to the story:

In the Balance

Tadeusz Bór-Komorowski: General, Polish Home Army. In reality he became, commander of the Home Army in the second half of 1943, after the previous commander, Stefan Grot-Rowecki, was arrested by the Gestapo.
Winston Churchill: Prime Minister of the United Kingdom
Adolf Hitler: German Führer
Cordell Hull: U.S. Secretary of State
George Marshall: U.S. Army Chief of Staff
Vyacheslav Molotov: Soviet foreign minister (a main character in Aftershocks)
George S. Patton: U.S. Army Major General
Joachim von Ribbentrop: German foreign minister
Leó Szilárd: Nuclear physicist, University of Chicago Metallurgical Laboratory
Hans Thomsen: German ambassador to the United States
Shigenori Tōgō: Japanese foreign minister
Walter Henry Zinn: Nuclear physicist, University of Chicago Metallurgical Laboratory

Tilting the Balance

Eric Blair: BBC talks producer, Indian Section, London. Better known by pen name George Orwell.
Kurt Chill: Wehrmacht general and interpreter in Pskov
Arthur Compton: Nuclear physicist with the Metallurgical Laboratory
Kurt Diebner: Nuclear physicist, Hechingen, Germany
Enrico Fermi: Nuclear physicist with the Metallurgical Laboratory
Laura Fermi: Enrico Fermi's wife
Georgy Flyorov: Soviet nuclear physicist
Aleksandr German: commander of Second Partisan Brigade in Pskov
Winston Churchill: Prime Minister of the United Kingdom
Werner Heisenberg: Nuclear physicist, Hechingen, Germany
Nieh Ho-T'ing: Chinese Communist guerrilla officer
Cordell Hull: U.S. secretary of state
Ivan Konev: Red Army general
Igor Kurchatov: Soviet nuclear physicist
Edward R. Murrow: Radio news broadcaster
Yoshio Nishina: Japanese nuclear physicist
Joachim von Ribbentrop: German foreign minister
Franklin D. Roosevelt: President of the United States
Mordechai Chaim Rumkowski: Eldest of the Jews in the Łódź ghetto
Iosef Stalin: general secretary of the Communist Party of the Soviet Union
Leó Szilárd: Nuclear physicist with the Metallurgical Laboratory
Shigenori Tōgō: Japanese foreign minister
Nikolai Vasilyev: commander, First Partisan Brigade in Pskov
Georgy Zhukov: Marshal of the Soviet Union

Upsetting the Balance

Max Aitken, Lord Beaverbrook: British Minister of Supply
Kurt Chill: Wehrmacht Lieutenant General
Kurt Diebner: Nuclear physicist, Tübingen, Germany
Albert Einstein: physicist, Couch, Missouri
Dwight D. Eisenhower: U.S. Army General, Couch, Missouri
Enrico Fermi: Nuclear physicist, Denver, Colorado
Aleksandr German: Partisan Brigadier, Pskov, USSR
Robert H. Goddard: Rocket expert, Couch, Missouri
Lord Halifax: British ambassador to the United States
Cordell Hull: U.S. Secretary of State
Nieh Ho-'Ting: People's Liberation Army officer, China
Benito Mussolini: Il Duce (Italian Dictator)
Joachim von Ribbentrop: German foreign minister
Iosef Stalin: general secretary, Communist Party of the USSR
Leó Szilárd: Nuclear physicist, Denver, Colorado
Nikolai Vasilyev: Partisan brigadier, Pskov, USSR

Striking the Balance

Menachem Begin: Jewish guerrilla, Haifa, Palestine
Omar Bradley: U.S. Army lieutenant general, outside Denver
Walter von Brockdorff-Ahlefeldt: Wehrmacht lieutenant general, Riga, Latvia
Kurt Chill: Wehrmacht lieutenant general, Pskov, USSR
William Joseph Donovan: U.S. Army major general, Hot Springs, Arkansas
Anthony Eden: British foreign secretary
Aleksandr German: Partisan brigadier, Pskov, USSR
Robert H. Goddard: Rocket scientist, Hot Springs, Arkansas
Cordell Hull: President of the United States following the death of Franklin D. Roosevelt
Igor Kurchatov: Nuclear physicist, north of Moscow
Mao Zedong: Communist Party leader, Peking
George Marshall: U.S. Secretary of State
Joachim von Ribbentrop: German foreign minister
Iosef Stalin: general secretary, Communist Party, USSR
Stern: Jewish guerrilla leader, Jerusalem. Identity is uncertain, a match is Avraham Stern
Shigenori Tōgō: Japanese foreign minister
Nikolai Vasilyev: Partisan brigadier, Pskov, USSR

References

Worldwar and Colonization series
Worldwar
Cultural depictions of Joseph Stalin
Cultural depictions of Adolf Hitler
Cultural depictions of Dwight D. Eisenhower
Cultural depictions of Albert Einstein
Cultural depictions of Mao Zedong
Cultural depictions of Winston Churchill
Cultural depictions of Franklin D. Roosevelt
Cultural depictions of George S. Patton
Cultural depictions of Menachem Begin
Cultural depictions of Benito Mussolini
Cultural depictions of Georgy Zhukov